Bent Fuglede (born 8 October 1925) is a Danish mathematician and, since 1992, professor emeritus at the University of Copenhagen.

Biography 
He is known for his contributions to mathematical analysis, in particular functional analysis, where he has proved Fuglede's theorem and stated Fuglede's conjecture.

Fuglede graduated from Skt. Jørgens Gymnasium 1943 and received his mag. scient. og cand. mag. in  1948 at the University of Copenhagen after which he studied in USA until 1951. In 1952 he was employed as scientific assistant at Den Polytekniske Læreanstalt and in 1954 as amanuensis at Matematisk Institut  University of Copenhagen, in 1958 associate professor, and in 1959 head of department. Fuglede also spent one year in Lund (Sweden) as Nordic docent. Fuglede received his dr.phil. (Ph.D.) in 1960 from the University of Copenhagen; his doctoral advisor was Børge Jessen. after which he became professor of math at Danmarks tekniske Højskole.  In 1965 he became professor of math at the University of Copenhagen, where he stayed until his retirement in 1992.

He is a member of the Royal Danish Academy of Sciences and Letters, the Finnish Academy of Science and Letters. and the Bayerische Akademie der Wissenschaften. In 2012 he became a fellow of the American Mathematical Society.

Books

Personal life 
Fuglende was married to Ólafía Einarsdóttir, an Icelandic archeologist and historian. They had one child together, Einar.

References

External links
 Fuglede's homepage at the University of Copenhagen

1925 births
Living people
Danish mathematicians
Academic staff of the University of Copenhagen
Fellows of the American Mathematical Society